Mechuka is one of the 60 assembly constituencies of  Arunachal Pradesh a north east state of India. It is part of Arunachal East Lok Sabha constituency.

Members of Legislative Assembly
 1978: Tadik Chije, Independent
 1980: Pasang Wangchuk Sona, Independent
 1984: Tadik Chije, Independent
 1990: Pasang Wangchuk Sona, Independent
 1995: Pasang Wangchuk Sona, Indian National Congress
 1999: Tadik Chije, Indian National Congress
 2004: Tadik Chije, Indian National Congress
 2009: Pasang Dorjee Sona, Indian National Congress
 2014: Pasang Dorjee Sona, Peoples Party of Arunachal

Election results

2019

See also

 Mechuka
 Shi Yomi district
 List of constituencies of Arunachal Pradesh Legislative Assembly

References

Assembly constituencies of Arunachal Pradesh
Shi Yomi district